William James Blake (1894–1968) was a broker, novelist and Marxist political economist. His birth name was Wilhelm Blech. His first marriage ended in divorce, and he then married Australian novelist Christina Stead, with whom he had been living since the late 1920s. Blake's father was physician, surgeon, and medical educator Gustavus M. Blech, M.D.

Blake's writings included the 1941 novel, The Copperheads, a character-heavy study of intrigues in New York City during the American Civil War, and An American Looks at Karl Marx, an introduction to and criticism of Marxism.

Blake died of stomach cancer.

References

External links
  (with information on Blake)
 

1894 births
1968 deaths
Marxian economists
20th-century American novelists
20th-century American male writers
Deaths from stomach cancer
American male novelists
20th-century American economists
American male non-fiction writers
Deaths from cancer in the United States